The 121st Street station was a local station on the demolished IRT Second Avenue Line in Manhattan, New York City. It had three tracks and two side platforms. The next stop to the north was 125th Street. The next stop to the south was 117th Street. The station closed on June 11, 1940.

References

External links
 

IRT Second Avenue Line stations
Railway stations closed in 1940
Former elevated and subway stations in Manhattan
1940 disestablishments in New York (state)